Vincent Mojwok Nyiker (25 January 1933 – 5 January 2018) was a Roman Catholic bishop.

Mojwok Nyiker was born in the Sudan and was ordained to the priesthood in 1962. He served as the bishop of the Roman Catholic Diocese of Malakal, South Sudan from 1979 to 2009.

He died in Khartoum in 2018.

Notes

1933 births
2018 deaths
20th-century Roman Catholic bishops in South Sudan
21st-century Roman Catholic bishops in South Sudan
South Sudanese Roman Catholic bishops
Roman Catholic bishops of Malakal